The Tonga women's national under-17 football team is the second highest women's youth team of women's football in Tonga and is controlled by the Tonga Football Association.

History
Tonga participated two times so far in the OFC U-17 Women's Championship. The first time, in 2010, they suffered three heavy defeats. Six years later there was more to be happy about, cause they won by four goals to one against Samoa. The goal were scored by Alexandra Fifita, Seini Lutu, Mele Kafa and Ana Polovili. This was the first and so far the only game that Tonga scored as well as to win. For Samoa, this was also a historical moment because they also scored their first goal ever.

Tonga's greatest football triumph to date was their triumph in the first ever Polynesian Cup held in 1993 over Samoa and the Cook Islands. Although local players have not yet made their mark on big leagues abroad, the Chief Executive of the Tonga Football Association, Joe Topou, was appointed to the FIFA Executive Committee in 2002. The Tonga association is the only sports organization on the island that employs full-time administrative staff.

Tonga's second Goal project will develop and improve the national football academy and the association's headquarters in Atele, Tongatapu, which was built in the country's first Goal project. This development work will ensure that all of the Tonga Football Associations needs are fully satisfied. Local matches will be held at the football academy, while the administration's requirements, including the needs of players, officials and spectators, will also be covered. The football school will be transformed into a House of Football.

OFC
The OFC Women's Under 17 Qualifying Tournament is a tournament held once every two years to decide the only qualification spot for Oceania Football Confederation (OFC) and representatives at the FIFA U-17 World Cup.

Current technical staff

Current squad
The following players were called up for the 2017 OFC U-16 Women's Championship

Caps and goals correct after match against American Samoa on August 11, 2017.

References

External links
Tonga Football Federation page
Oceania Football Federation page

Women's national under-17 association football teams
women's